Lesbates acromii is a species of beetle in the family Cerambycidae. It was described by Dalman in 1823. It is known from Brazil.

References

Onciderini
Beetles described in 1823